The Agape League is a high school athletic league affiliated with the CIF Southern Section. Most of its members are independent, Christian schools located in and around the High Desert region in Los Angeles County, San Bernardino and Riverside County. The Agape League plays Eight-man football and volleyball.

Members
 Antelope Valley Christian School
 Apple Valley Christian School
 Bethel Christian School
 Hesperia Christian School
 Lucerne Valley High School
 Victor Valley Christian School
 University Careers & Sports Academy (UCSA)

Football-Only Members
 California Lutheran High School
 Upland Christian Academy

References

CIF Southern Section leagues